Chinautla is a city and municipality in the Guatemala department of Guatemala. The city has a population of 104,972 (2018 census) making it the fourteenth largest city in the country and the seventh largest in the Guatemala Department.

Administrative division 

Chinautla has eleven villages:
 Los Jocotales
 San Martín
 San José Buena Vista
 El Durazno
 Tres Sabanas
 Las Lomas
 Cumbre de Guayabo
 San Antonio las Flores
 San Rafael las Flores
 La Laguneta
 El Chan
 Concepción Sacojito

Climate 

Chinautla has tropical climate (Köppen: Aw).

Geographic location 
Located at the center of Guatemala Department, it is surrounded by municipalities of that Department only:

See also
 
 
List of places in Guatemala
Guatemala City

Notes and references

References

Bibliography

Further reading

Medrano Family (in Spanish)

External links
 

Municipalities of the Guatemala Department